Dame Emilie Rose Macaulay,  (1 August 1881 – 30 October 1958) was an English writer, most noted for her award-winning novel The Towers of Trebizond, about a small Anglo-Catholic group crossing Turkey by camel. The story is seen as a spiritual autobiography, reflecting her own changing and conflicting beliefs. Macaulay's novels were partly influenced by Virginia Woolf; she also wrote biographies and travelogues.

Early years and education
Macaulay was born in Rugby, Warwickshire the daughter of George Campbell Macaulay, a classical scholar, and his wife, Grace Mary (née Conybeare). Her father was descended in the male-line directly from the Macaulay family of Lewis. She was educated at Oxford High School for Girls and read Modern History at Somerville College at Oxford University.

Career
Macaulay began writing her first novel, Abbots Verney (published 1906), after leaving Somerville and while living with her parents at Ty Isaf, near Aberystwyth, in Wales. Later novels include The Lee Shore (1912), Potterism (1920), Dangerous Ages (1921), Told by an Idiot (1923), And No Man's Wit (1940), The World My Wilderness (1950), and The Towers of Trebizond (1956). Her non-fiction work includes They Went to Portugal, Catchwords and Claptrap, a biography of John Milton, and Pleasure of Ruins. Macaulay's fiction was influenced by Virginia Woolf and Anatole France.

During World War I Macaulay worked in the British Propaganda Department, after some time as a nurse and later as a civil servant in the War Office. She pursued a romantic affair with Gerald O'Donovan, a writer and former Jesuit priest, whom she met in 1918; the relationship lasted until his death, in 1942. During the interwar period she was a sponsor of the pacifist Peace Pledge Union; however she resigned from the PPU and later recanted her pacifism in 1940. Her London flat was destroyed in the Blitz, and she had to rebuild her life and library from scratch, as documented in the semi-autobiographical short story, Miss Anstruther's Letters, which was published in 1942.

The Towers of Trebizond, her final novel, is generally regarded as her masterpiece. Strongly autobiographical, it treats with wistful humour and deep sadness the attractions of mystical Christianity, and the irremediable conflict between adulterous love and the demands of the Christian faith. For this work, she received the James Tait Black Memorial Prize in 1956.

Personal life

Macaulay was never a simple believer in "mere Christianity", and her writings reveal a more complex, mystical sense of the Divine. That said, she did not return to the Anglican church until 1953; she had been an ardent secularist before and, while religious themes pervade her novels, previous to her conversion she often treats Christianity satirically, for instance in Going Abroad and The World My Wilderness.

Macaulay never married. She was created a Dame Commander of the Order of the British Empire (DBE) on 31 December 1957 in the 1958 New Years Honours and died ten months later, on 30 October 1958, aged 77. She was an active feminist throughout her life.

Works
Fiction:
 Abbots Verney (1906) John Murray
 The Furnace (1907) John Murray
 The Secret River (1909) John Murray
 The Valley Captives (1911) John Murray
 Views and Vagabonds (1912) John Murray 
 The Lee Shore (1913) Hodder & Stoughton
 The Making of a Bigot (c 1914) Hodder & Stoughton
 Non-Combatants and Others (1916) Hodder & Stoughton
 What Not: A Prophetic Comedy (1918)
 Potterism (1920) William Collins
 Dangerous Ages (1921) William Collins
 Mystery At Geneva: An Improbable Tale of Singular Happenings (1922) William Collins
 Told by an Idiot (1923) William Collins
 Orphan Island (1924) William Collins
 Crewe Train (1926) William Collins
 Keeping Up Appearances (1928) William Collins
 Staying with Relations (1930) William Collins
 They Were Defeated (1932) William Collins
 Going Abroad (1934) William Collins
 I Would Be Private (1937) William Collins
 And No Man's Wit (1940) William Collins
 The World My Wilderness (1950) William Collins
 The Towers of Trebizond (1956) William Collins

Poetry:
 The Two Blind Countries (1914) Sidgwick & Jackson
 Three Days (1919) Constable
 Misfortunes, with engravings by Stanley Morison (1930)

Non-fiction:

 A Casual Commentary (1925) Methuen
 Some Religious Elements in English Literature (1931) Hogarth
 Milton (1934) Duckworth
 Personal Pleasures (1935) Gollancz
 The Minor Pleasures of Life (1936) Gollancz
 An Open Letter (1937) Peace Pledge Union
 The Writings of E.M. Forster (1938) Hogarth
 Life Among the English (1942) William Collins
 Southey in Portugal (1945) Nicholson & Watson
 They Went to Portugal (1946) Jonathan Cape
 Evelyn Waugh (1946) Horizon
 Fabled Shore: From the Pyrenees to Portugal By Road (1949) Hamish Hamilton
 Pleasure of Ruins (1953) Thames & Hudson
 Coming to London (1957) Phoenix House
 Letters to a Friend 1950–52 (1961) William Collins
 Last Letters to a Friend 1952–1958 (1962) William Collins
 Letters to a Sister (1964) William Collins
 They Went to Portugal Too (1990) (The second part of They Went to Portugal, not published with the 1946 edition because of paper restrictions.) Carcanet

References

Further reading

 Hein, David. "Faith and Doubt in Rose Macaulay's The Towers of Trebizond." Anglican Theological Review 88 (2006): 47–68. Abstract: http://www.anglicantheologicalreview.org/read/article/508/
 Hein, David. "Rose Macaulay: A Voice from the Edge." In David Hein and Edward Henderson, eds., C. S. Lewis and Friends: Faith and the Power of Imagination, 93–115. London: SPCK; Eugene, OR: Cascade, 2011.

 Martin Ferguson Smith (ed), Dearest Jean: Rose Macaulay’s letters to a cousin (Manchester, Manchester University Press, 2011).

External links

 
 
 
 
 
 
 Profile of Rose on Great Shelford website where she lived some of her life

1881 births
1958 deaths
Alumni of Somerville College, Oxford
Anglo-Catholic writers
British women in World War I
Dames Commander of the Order of the British Empire
English Anglo-Catholics
English feminists
English people of Scottish descent
English women novelists
Female nurses in World War I
James Tait Black Memorial Prize recipients
Rose
People educated at Oxford High School, England
People from Rugby, Warwickshire
Place of death missing